The 2013–14 Lithuanian Women's Handball League season is the 24th season of the Lithuanian Women's Handball League, the top level women's handball in Lithuania. Five teams participated in the league, when four regular teams withdrew from the league (MRK KKSC Panevėžys, MRK KKSC Utena, Tauras-Vilniaus bakalėja Vilnius, Širšės Kaunas) League started at 5 October 2013 and will finish at 7 June 2014.

Regular season

Playoffs

Semifinals
 (1) ACME-Žalgiris - (4) Eglė Vilnius (47:28, 51:24, 47:33)
 (2) SM Tauras-Vilniaus kolegija - (3) HC SM Garliava (26:28, 37:33, 29:26, 29:34, 32:24)

3rd place game
 (4) Eglė Vilnius - (3) HC SM Garliava (29:35, 26:30)

Final
 (1) ACME-Žalgiris - (2) SM Tauras-Vilniaus kolegija (36:33, 27:24, 38:31)

References

External links
 Official website

2013–14 domestic handball leagues
2013 in Lithuanian sport
2014 in Lithuanian sport
Lithuanian Women's Handball League seasons